Mongezi Bobe (born 16 May 1981 in Carletonville, Gauteng) is a South African footballer who currently plays for Black Leopards in the Premier Soccer League.

He was a captain of Black Leopards, for which he played for five seasons. On 19 August 2014, he returned to the club after
a difficult season at Free State Stars.

References

1981 births
Living people
People from Carletonville
Association football midfielders
Black Leopards F.C. players
South African soccer players
Platinum Stars F.C. players
Free State Stars F.C. players
F.C. AK players
Soccer players from Gauteng